With God for Emperor and Empire (German: Mit Gott für Kaiser und Reich) is a 1916 German silent war drama film directed by Jacob Fleck and Luise Fleck and starring Hermann Benke and Liane Haid. The celebrated operetta composer Karl Michael Ziehrer wrote a score to accompany the film at screenings.

It was one of a number of patriotic propaganda films made to support Austria's war effort during the First World War.

Cast
 Hermann Benke as Marjor von Hess 
 Josephine Josephi as seine Mutter 
 Liane Haid as seine Tochter Liane 
 Hans Rhoden as Leutnant Falk

References

Bibliography
 Robert Von Dassanowsky. Austrian Cinema: A History. McFarland, 2005.

External links

Austro-Hungarian films
1916 films
Austrian silent feature films
Austrian war drama films
Films directed by Jacob Fleck
Films directed by Luise Fleck
Austrian black-and-white films
1910s war drama films
1916 drama films
World War I propaganda films
Silent war drama films